The sixth USS Congress (ID-3698) was a motor launch in commission in the United States Navy as a patrol vessel from 1918 to 1919.
 
Congress was built as the private fishing vessel Congress in 1914 at Gwynn, Virginia. The U.S. Navys 5th Naval District inspected her on 17 May 1918 for possible World War I service. The Navy purchased her from A. Foster of Grimstead, Virginia, in October 1918, having already commissioned her as USS Congress on 25 September 1918. The Navy assigned her Identification Number (Id. No.) 3698 and placed her in service on 18 October 1918.

Congress carried out miscellaneous patrol duties in the 5th Naval District until 23 September 1919, when she was stricken from the Navy Directory. She was sold on 23 September 1919, then possibly resold on 8 December 1919, ultimately being delivered to Sallie S. Thorns of West Norfolk, Virginia, on 24 December 1919.

References

Department of the Navy: Naval Historical Center: Online Library of Selected Images: Civilian Ships: Congress (American Fishing Boat, 1914). Served as USS Congress (ID # 3698) in 1918–1919

Patrol vessels of the United States Navy
World War I patrol vessels of the United States
Ships built in Norfolk, Virginia
1914 ships